Gerald Lawrence Schroeder is an Orthodox Jewish physicist, author, lecturer and teacher at College of Jewish Studies Aish HaTorah's Discovery Seminar, Essentials and Fellowships programs and Executive Learning Center, who focuses on what he perceives to be an inherent relationship between science and spirituality.

Education
Schroeder received his BSc in 1959, his MSc in 1961, and his PhD in nuclear physics and earth and planetary sciences in 1965, from the Massachusetts Institute of Technology (MIT). He worked seven years on the staff of the MIT physics department. He was a member of the United States Atomic Energy Commission.

Aliyah to Israel
After emigrating to Israel in 1971, Schroeder was employed as a researcher at the Weizmann Institute of Science, the Volcani Research Institute, and the Hebrew University of Jerusalem. He currently teaches at Aish HaTorah College of Jewish Studies.

Religion and science 
His works frequently cite Talmudic, Midrashic and medieval commentaries on biblical creation accounts, such as commentaries written by the Jewish philosopher Nachmanides. Among other things, Schroeder attempts to reconcile a six-day creation as described in Genesis with the scientific evidence that the world is billions of years old using the idea that the perceived flow of time for a given event in an expanding universe varies with the observer's perspective of that event. He attempts to reconcile the two perspectives numerically, calculating the effect of the stretching of space-time, based on Albert Einstein's general relativity.

Namely, that from the perspective of the point of origin of the Big Bang, according to Einstein's equations of the 'stretching factor', time dilates by a factor of roughly 1,000,000,000,000, meaning one trillion days on earth would appear to pass as one day from that point, due to the stretching of space. When applied to the estimated age of the universe at 13.8 billion years, from the perspective of the point of origin, the universe today would appear to have just begun its sixth day of existence, or if the universe is 15 billion years old from the perspective of earth, it would appear to have just completed its sixth day.
Antony Flew, an academic philosopher who promoted atheism for most of his adult life indicated that the arguments of Gerald Schroeder had influenced his decision to become a deist.

His theories to reconcile faith and science have drawn some criticism from both religious and non-religious scientists, and his works remain controversial in scientific circles.

Personal
Schroeder's wife Barbara Sofer is a columnist for the English language Israeli newspaper Jerusalem Post. The couple have five children.

Prizes
In 2012, Schroeder was awarded the Trotter Prize by Texas A&M University's College of Science.

Works
 Genesis and the Big Bang (1990), 
 The Science of God: The Convergence of Scientific and Biblical Wisdom, (1997), 
 The Hidden Face of God: Science Reveals the Ultimate Truth, (2002), .
 God According to God: A Physicist Proves We've Been Wrong About God All Along, (2009), .

References

External links 

 Gerald Schroeder (official website)
 MIT Alumni Association. News and Views: Nuclear Scientist Sees No God-Science Conflict
 Dr. Schroeder speaking on cosmology: a 30 min. clip from the documentary, "Has Science Discovered God?"
 "The Age of the Universe", aish.com
Critiques of Schroeder's books by Mark Perakh at the site Talk Reason 1999, 2005, 2007
Critique of Genesis & the Big Bang, authored by Rabbi Yoram Bogacz.

Articles by Gerald L. Schroeder
God and the laws of natures
The Origins of Life
An Atheist Turns
Evolution: Rationality vs. Randomness
Age of the Universe 

American Orthodox Jews
Jewish scientists
Jewish physicists
21st-century American physicists
Israeli physicists
American nuclear physicists
Israeli nuclear physicists
Judaism and science
Aish HaTorah
American emigrants to Israel
Year of birth missing (living people)
Living people
Israeli Orthodox Jews
Jewish creationists
Old Earth creationism
Writers about religion and science
MIT Department of Physics alumni